Ptox is a genus of butterflies in the family Lycaenidae.

Species
Ptox catreus (de Nicéville, 1895)
Ptox corythus (de Nicéville, 1895)

References

Polyommatini
Lycaenidae genera
Taxa named by Lambertus Johannes Toxopeus